Kit and Kate (stylised as Kit ^n^ Kate) is a Russian series of animated shorts produced by Russian company Toonbox (whose animation studio and ABC Kids office were later respectively relocated to Cyprus), in conjunction with a team of American, French and Russian artists.

Plot
The cat siblings Kit and Kate, wondering what to play for the day, get inside a box and discover an item. The siblings then get out of the box and go on an 'adventure' related to the item. However, their 'adventure' often ends in a bad result because of a behaviour of either Kit, Kate or both. Then, either the siblings' mother or father appears, disguised as someone passing by, listens to the siblings, and gives some advice. The siblings, already recognising their parent, thank the parent, and go on their 'adventure' again from the beginning, but doing some things differently as advised, this time ending in success.

In every episode of season 2, Kit and Kate make up a story together, sometimes getting help from their parents and grandfather to think of the name of the story and its synopsis. The story then begins with a character doing a specific thing. Then, Kit and Kate high-five each other which magically sends them into the story. Often, the character mentioned in the story or Kit and Kate get into a bit of a hassle, but as soon as they learn something, they try retelling the story, but this time changing it via the moral that they learnt all the way.

Characters
  Kit (Male) Desc: Kit is a male kitten in the series Kit And Kate. He is the eldest sibling in their family. He sometimes teaches Kate a few things, and Kit is very supportive. Kit also sometimes does a bad thing like he cheated on hiding and seeking in the episode called "The Cheat Is On".
Age:6-7
Appearance: Orange shirt, Green shorts.
 Kate (Female) Desc: Kate is the youngest sibling in the family. She only knows a few things but she still plays with Kit. Also, Kate is often the one who learns and subsequently recites the lesson in the end. also, she tried so hard and yet so far, and in the end, it doesn't even matter.
Age:5
Appearance: Pink dress with a star in the middle.
 Mom Kit and Kate's mom.
 Dad Kit and Kate's dad.
 Grandpa Kit and Kate's grandfather. Introduced in season 2.
Hansel and Gretel introduced in season 1. Both brother and sister. As appropriate to their storybook counterpart, they speak with a German accent.
 Ducks 
 Quick (duck)
 Quack (duck)
 Quake (duck)

List of episodes [Season 1]

List of episodes [Season 2]

References

External links
 
 Toonbox Animation Studio

2010s animated television series
Russian children's animated television series
Russian animated short films
French children's animated television series
French animated short films
American children's animated television series
American animated short films
Animated web series
Animated television series about cats
Animated television series about children
Animated television series about siblings